Deng Hanwen (born 8 January 1995) is a Chinese footballer who currently plays as a right-back for Wuhan Three Towns in the Chinese Super League.

Club career
Deng Hanwen started his football career when he joined Guizhou Renhe's youth academy in 2009. He was then loaned out to Alverca and Real Massamá for youth training as part of the Chinese Football Association's 500.com Stars Project between 2011 and 2013. He returned to China in 2013 for the 2013 National Games of China.

Deng transferred to China League Two side Taiyuan Zhongyou in the 2014 season. On 27 September 2014, he scored his first senior goal in a 1–1 away draw against Lijiang Jiayunhao in the 2014 China League Two play-offs. He scored one goal in 15 appearances as the club finished as runners-up and was promoted to the second tier, where the club changed its name to Nei Mongol Zhongyou. On 7 May 2016, he scored his first goal in the China League One in a 3–2 home win against Meizhou Hakka. After his promising performances in the 2016 season, Deng became the first national team player in club history when he was called up to the Chinese national team in December 2016.

Deng was linked with his hometown club Chongqing Lifan before the 2017 season; however, he eventually returned to fellow second tier side Beijing Renhe on 28 February 2017. He made his debut for the club on 11 March 2017 in a 2–2 home draw against Shanghai Shenxin. On 8 October 2017, he scored his first goal for the club in a 2–0 home win against Xinjiang Tianshan Leopard, sealing the club's promotion back to the top tier. During the 2017 season, Deng made 25 appearances and scored once in all competitions.

On 24 December 2017, Deng transferred to Chinese Super League side Guangzhou Evergrande. He made his debut for the club on 26 February 2018 in a 4–1 win against Shanghai Shenhua in the 2018 Chinese FA Super Cup. On 2 March 2018, he made his Super League debut in a 5–4 home loss against Guangzhou R&F. On 2 May 2018, in the fifth round of 2018 Chinese FA Cup against Guizhou Hengfeng, Deng failed to convert his kick in the penalty shootout, having his shot saved by Su Boyang as Guangzhou lost 4–1 in the penalty shootout. On 29 July 2018, Deng scored his first goal for the club in a 5–0 home win against Chongqing Lifan.

On 29 April 2022, he signed with newly promoted top tier side Wuhan Three Towns. He would go on to make his debut on 3 June 2022, in a league game against Hebei, which ended in a 4-0 victory. After the game he would go on to establish himself as a regular within the team that won the 2022 Chinese Super League title.

International career
Deng was called up to the Chinese national team for the first time by then manager Marcello Lippi in December 2016 for the 2017 China Cup. He made his international debut on 10 January 2017 in a 2–0 loss against Iceland during the China Cup. He assisted Wang Jingbin's late equalizer on 14 January 2016 in the third-place playoff against Croatia, which China won 5–4 in the penalty shootout. He scored his first and second goal for China on 7 June 2017 in an 8–1 win against Philippines.

Career statistics

Club statistics

International statistics

International goals

Scores and results list China's goal tally first.

Honours

Club
Guangzhou Evergrande
Chinese Super League: 2019
Chinese FA Super Cup: 2018

Wuhan Three Towns
Chinese Super League: 2022.

References

External links
 
 

1995 births
Living people
Chinese footballers
Footballers from Chongqing
Inner Mongolia Zhongyou F.C. players
Beijing Renhe F.C. players
Guangzhou F.C. players
Chinese Super League players
China League One players
China League Two players
Association football defenders
China international footballers
Footballers at the 2018 Asian Games
Asian Games competitors for China
21st-century Chinese people